Namaquanula is a plant genus in the Amaryllidaceae, found only in Namibia and the Cape Province of South Africa. There are 2 recognized species:

Namaquanula bruce-bayeri D.Müll.-Doblies & U. Müll.-Doblies - Namibia, Northern Cape Province
Namaquanula bruynsii Snijman - Namibia

References

Amaryllidaceae genera